Sierra Leone competed at the 1988 Summer Olympics in Seoul, South Korea. Twelve competitors, eleven men and one woman, took part in fourteen events in four sports.

Competitors
The following is the list of number of competitors in the Games.

Athletics

Men's Marathon 
 Baba Ibrahim Suma-Keita — 3:04.00 (→ 95th place)

Men's 4 × 400 m Relay 
 Horace Dove-Edwin, Felix Sandy, Benjamin Grant, and David Sawyerr 
 Heat — 3:10.47 (→ did not advance)

Men's Long Jump 
 Francis Keita 
 Qualification — 6.87m (→ did not advance)

Boxing

Cycling

One male cyclist represented Sierra Leone in 1988.

Men's road race
 Frank Williams

Weightlifting

References

External links
Official Olympic Reports

Nations at the 1988 Summer Olympics
1988
Oly